Marcus Rapp is a Swiss Olympic middle-distance runner. He represented his country in the men's 1500 meters at the 1992 Summer Olympics. His time was a 3:42.64 in the first heat.

References

1957 births
Living people
Swiss male middle-distance runners
Olympic athletes of Switzerland
Athletes (track and field) at the 1988 Summer Olympics
People from Bellinzona
Sportspeople from Ticino